Akshimrau (also known as Akshynyrau (Aqshımırau, اقشىمىراۋ)) is a town in Mangystau Region, southwest Kazakhstan.

References

Mangystau Region
Cities and towns in Kazakhstan